The Mae Ngat Somboon Chon Dam, is a multi-purpose hydroelectric dam in the Mae Taeng District of Chiang Mai Province, Thailand. It impounds the Mae Ngat River, a tributary of the Ping River. The dam is located at the western side of Si Lanna National Park.

Description
Mae Ngat Somboon Chon Dam is an earth fill dam.

Power plant
The dam's power plant has two hydroelectric generating units, each with an installed capacity of 4.5 MW. They became operational in 1985.

References

Dams in Thailand
Earth-filled dams
Hydroelectric power stations in Thailand
Energy infrastructure completed in 1986
1986 establishments in Thailand
Buildings and structures in Chiang Mai province
Dams completed in 1986